Rejection, or the verb reject, may refer to:

 Social rejection, in psychology, an interpersonal situation that occurs when a person or group of people exclude an individual from a social relationship
 Transplant rejection, in medicine, the immune reaction of a host organism to a foreign biological tissue, such as in a transplantation
 In telecommunications, rejection is the receiving of the desired signal without interference from another undesired one.
 In basketball, rejection is a slang term for a block
 In mathematics, the rejection of a vector a from a vector b is the component of a perpendicular to b, as opposed to its projection, which is parallel to b.
 In statistics, rejection of a null hypothesis in favour of an alternative hypothesis when doing a hypothesis test.
 In statistics, rejection sampling is a technique used to generate observations from a distribution
 In zoology, the shunning of one or more animals in a litter
 Rejection of Jesus, described in the New Testament

Art, media and entertainent
 Reject, a song by Green Day from Nimrod
 The Rejection (EP)
 Rejection (song), song by Martin Solveig
Rejection, a 2009 film with Gary Farmer
Rejection (film), a 2011 Ukrainian film
 "Rejection", a song by AC/DC from Power Up

See also 
 Accept (disambiguation), the opposite of rejection
 Rejectionism (disambiguation)